The Land That Time Forgot (promotionally titled Edgar Rice Burrough's The Land That Time Forgot, release in other countries as Dinosaur Island) is a 2009 science fiction film by independent American film studio The Asylum, directed by and starring C. Thomas Howell. It is an adaptation of the 1918 Edgar Rice Burroughs novel of the same name, and a remake of the 1975 film starring Doug McClure.

Plot 

The film takes place in the present, when two newlywed couples are enjoying a charter boat cruise through the Caribbean. Passing through a bizarre storm, they emerge off the shore of the mysterious island of Caprona.

The island, which seems to exist within a time void inside the Bermuda Triangle, is full of anachronistic inhabitants, including dinosaurs and the crew of a stranded German U-boat.  The newlyweds, along with the charter boat's captain and the Germans, must battle a variety of obstacles to escape from the island and get back to their own time.

At first the plan is to rescue a woman named Karen from the Germans and then take their boat away, but their guides Jude and Conrad betray them and steal the boat, leaving them to the Germans.  Eventually, the captain convinces the Germans to work together to get off the island. They are able to free the U-boat and make diesel fuel from oil on the island.  Unfortunately, Frost is left behind as he can't get to the sub in time and his wife Karen joins him on the island again.  The sub gets away, but it is unclear if it ever returned to civilization.  Frost writes down his story and puts in a thermos and throws it in the ocean.  He and Karen have found a life on the island and Karen is pregnant.

Cast 

Prehistoric creatures

Tyrannosaurus 
Pteranodon 
Brontosaurus (carcass only)

See also 
 The Land That Time Forgot - A 1975 film starring Doug McClure
 The Land That Time Forgot - The 1918 novel by Edgar Rice Burroughs.
 Princess of Mars - another film by The Asylum based on books by Edgar Rice Burroughs, released in the same year.
 War of the Worlds 2: The Next Wave - Another Asylum film starring and directed by C. Thomas Howell, who also appeared in the previous film H. G. Wells' War of the Worlds.
 The Day the Earth Stopped another science fiction film by The Asylum starring and directed by C. Thomas Howell

References

External links 
 The Land That Time Forgot announcement at The Asylum
 The Land That Time Forgot main listing at The Asylum
 

Films directed by C. Thomas Howell
Caspak trilogy
2009 science fiction films
2009 fantasy films
2009 independent films
2009 films
American science fiction films
The Asylum films
Mockbuster films
Films about dinosaurs
Direct-to-video science fiction films
American remakes of British films
Films based on American novels
Films based on fantasy novels
Films based on science fiction novels
Films based on works by Edgar Rice Burroughs
Films set in the Bermuda Triangle
Films set on fictional islands
Lost world films
2000s English-language films
2000s American films